Scales Mound Community Unit School District 211 is a school district headquartered in Scales Mound, Illinois.

Its schools include Scales Mound Elementary School, Scaled Mound Junior High School, and Scales Mound High School.

References

External links
 
Education in Jo Daviess County, Illinois
School districts in Illinois